The molecular formula C20H24O6 (molar mass : 360.40 g/mol, exact mass : 360.157289 u) may refer to: 

 Dibenzo-18-crown-6, a benzannulated crown ether
 Lariciresinol, a lignan
 Triptolide, a diterpene